The 2014 Sun Belt women's basketball tournament will be the postseason women's basketball tournament for the Sun Belt Conference beginning on March 12, 2014, and ending on March 15, 2014, in New Orleans, Louisiana at the Lakefront Arena

Seeds

Schedule

Bracket

References

External links
 2014 Sun Belt Women's Basketball Championship

2013–14 NCAA Division I women's basketball season
Sun Belt Conference women's basketball tournament
2013–14 Sun Belt Conference women's basketball season
Sun Belt Conference Women's B
Sun Belt Conference women's basketball tournament